Nick Powell is an English musician and songwriter. He is the singer and bassist of the rock band Sebastopol. Prior to Sebastopol he was the bassist in the now defunct band Kinky Machine. In addition, he is a photographer responsible for the two Twelfth Night album covers for Collector's Item and Live and Let Live.

Select discography 
The Pleasers: Thamesbeat (1977)
Kinky Machine: Bent (1994)
Kinky Machine: London Crawling (1995)
Faultline: Closer Colder (1999)
Sebastopol: Hello All Stations, This is Zero (2012)

References 

English rock singers
English rock bass guitarists
English songwriters
Year of birth missing (living people)
Living people